Agnes Baldwin may refer to:

 Agnes Baldwin Alexander (1875–1971), American author
 Agnes Baldwin Brett (1876–1955), American numismatist and archaeologist 
 Agnes Baldwin Webb (1926–2001), American basketball player